Voz e Violão – No Recreio – Volume 1 os the fourth live album by Brazilian singer-songwriter Nando Reis. The album features only Reis, without his supporting band Os Infernais. The performance was captured in an April night at Citibank Hall in São Paulo, with an attendance of 3,7 thousand people.

The idea of making an album in this format came in February 2015 after Reis took part  of the project Sala de Estar (Living Room), at SESC Pompeia, in which he performed four times with his acoustic guitar only. He describes the experience of having decided the tracks of the album as follows: "I revisited some songs, in terms of hearing, of looking at my own discography. I listened to some songs again". Oe of the song is previously unreleased: "Diariamente", written by him, bit originally featured at Marisa Monte's 1991 album Mais.

References 

2015 live albums
Nando Reis albums
Portuguese-language albums